Reims à Toutes Jambes (English: Reims at Full Speed) is an annual road running event held in Reims, France in the month of October. First held in 1984, the competition comprises three main parts: a 42.195 km marathon, a 21.0975 km half marathon race, and a 10 km race. In addition to these, there are smaller competitions for disabled athletes and children. The marathon course is a figure-8 run twice and has hosted the French national championship race on three occasions (1997, 1999, 2000).

Both the marathon and the half marathon attract elite level competitors. The marathon course records are held by David Kemboi (2:07:53 hours) and Alla Zhilyaeva (2:27:38 hours). The best times for the half marathon are by Dieudonné Disi (1:01:13) and Christelle Daunay (1:08:34).

In 2015 the running festival was organized by the 'Run In' group along with Lyon and Marseille. It was rebranded 'Run In Reims'.

List of winners

Marathon

Key:

Half marathon

References 

List of winners
Reims Marathon. Association of Road Racing Statisticians (2010-11-25). Retrieved on 2011-10-02.
Reims Half Marathon.Association of Road Racing Statisticians. Retrieved on 2014-04-27.

External links
Official website 
Marathoninfo page

Half marathons in France
Sport in Reims
Marathons in France
10K runs
Recurring sporting events established in 1984
Annual sporting events in France
1984 establishments in France
Autumn events in France